Présence Africaine is a pan-African quarterly cultural, political, and literary magazine, published in Paris, France, and founded by Alioune Diop in 1947. In 1949, Présence Africaine expanded to include a publishing house and a bookstore on rue des Écoles in the Latin Quarter of Paris. The journal was highly influential in the Pan-Africanist movement, the decolonisation struggle of former French colonies, and the birth of the Négritude movement.

Magazine
The magazine published its first issue in November 1947, founded by Alioune Diop a Senegal-born professor of philosophy, along with a cast of African, European, and American intellectuals, writers, and social scientists, including Aimé Césaire, Léopold Sédar Senghor, Alioune Sarr, Richard Wright, Albert Camus, André Gide, Jean-Paul Sartre, Théodore Monod, Georges Balandier and Michel Leiris. While not all authors published in the magazine were from the African diaspora, its subtitle (Revue Culturelle du Monde Noir/Cultural Review of the Negro World) makes clear that the editors saw themselves engaged in the cultural and political struggles of panafricanism. With the move by Aimé Césaire and Léopold Sédar Senghor to PA (from Césaire's own journal L'Étudiant noir), the magazine became the pre-eminent voice of the Négritude movement.

In 1956, Alioune Diop and Présence Africaine organised the 1st International Congress of Black Writers and Artists (1er Congrès international des écrivains et artistes noirs) in Paris, which included Aimé Césaire, Léopold Sédar Senghor, Jacques Rabemananjara, Cheikh Anta Diop, Richard Wright, Franz Fanon, and Jean Price-Mars, and for which Pablo Picasso designed a poster.

Although there have occasionally been English-language pieces and English-language abstracts in the magazine since its start, French has always been the main language. Between 1955 and January 1961, the magazine also published an English edition (also entitled Présence Africaine), which ran to 60 issues.

Through the leadership of Aimé Césaire, Présence Africaine was an anti-colonialist magazine as well. Their articles were a direct involvement with the anti-colonialist struggle and together, the writers and thinkers strived to denounce colonial racism through their foundational texts. 

Although Césaire's most famous text Discours sur le Colonialisme is constantly being republished and translated (and scholars such as Robin D.G. Kelley have added their contributions including “A Poetics of Anticolonialism,”) Césaire's original text was published as Discours sur le Colonialisme by the Présence Africaine in 1955. The essay had previously been published in 1950 by Editions Redame, and a revised version was published in Présance Africane in 1955. 

The works from Présence Africaine were also used in other anti-colonialist literature. For example, Frantz Fanon used excerpts from Présence Africaine in his anti-colonialist text Black Skin, White Masks. He cites the work of Aimé Césaire, Michel Salomon, Abdoulaye Sadji, George Moulin, and countless other essential thinkers in order to strengthen his claims about denouncing colonial racism.

Publishing house 
Editions Présence Africaine was the first imprint to publish most of the best known Francophone African writers of the 20th century, including the literature of Mongo Beti, Ken Bugul, Birago Diop, Djibril Tamsir Niane, Williams Sassine, Ousmane Sembène, Léopold Sédar Senghor, as well as the philosophical works of Cheikh Anta Diop among others. Editions Présence Africaine was also the first to publish French translations of Anglophone writers such as Chinua Achebe, Wole Soyinka, Ngugi wa Thiong’o, and the pan-Africanist leaders Kwame Nkrumah and Julius Nyerere.

Recent history 
Alioune Diop remained publisher until his death in 1980, when his wife Christiane Yandé Diop took over. The 50th anniversary of Présence Africaine was celebrated at UNESCO in Paris in 1997, and attended by Daniel Maximin and Wole Soyinka among others.

As of the end of 2007 Présence Africaine had run to 173 issues, with its Editions Présence Africaine publishing over 400 works, 322 of which are still in print. Discourse on Colonialism by Aimé Césaire, published first in 1955, remains its best-selling work. In addition, new African works are published, by novelists including Hamidou Dia, Antoinette Tidjani Alou and Dieudonné Gnammankou and historians such as Aboucrary Moussa Lam.

Présence Africaine′s current publications director is Romuald Fonkoua, professor of comparative French literature at Université Marc Bloch in Strasbourg.

See also
 Decolonisation of Africa
 Négritude

References

 Tshitenge Lubaru M. K., "Soixante ans de Présence", Jeune Afrique, n° 2448, 9 December 2007, p. 108.
 Much of this article was translated from the French-language Wikipedia article :fr:Présence africaine (2008-05-23).

Bibliography
 Bennetta Jules-Rosette, Black Paris: The African Writer's Landscape, Chicago: University of Illinois Press, 1998.
 Sarah C Dunstan, Race, Rights and Reform: Black Activism in the French Empire and the United States from World War I to Cold War, New York: Cambridge University Press, 2021, pp. 207-236.
 Marga Graf,  "Roots of Identity: The National and Cultural Self in 'Présence Africaine'", Comparative Literature and Culture, June 2001, 3(2).
 Salah D. Hassan, "Inaugural Issues: the cultural politics of the early 'Présence Africaine'", Research in African Literatures, 30:2, Summer 1999, pp. 194–221.
 Valentin Y. Mudimbe (ed.), The Surreptitious Speech: "Présence Africaine" and the Politics of Otherness, 1947-1987, Chicago: University of Chicago Press, 1992.
  Léopold Sédar Senghor et la revue "Présence Africaine", Paris: Présence Africaine, 1996, 250 pp.  (Anthology of Senghor's writings in PA).
  Jacques Howlett, Index alphabétique des auteurs et index des matières de la revue "Présence Africaine", Paris: Présence Africaine, 1977, 381 pp. 
  Micaela Fenoglio, "Présence africaine" entre critique et littérature: l'esprit du dialogue, Rome: Bulzoni, 1998.
  Marcella Glisenti (ed.), Hommage à Alioune Diop, fondateur de Présence Africaine, Rome: Éditions des amis italiens de Présence Africaine, 1977.
  Lilyan Kesteloot, Les Écrivains noirs de langue française: naissance d'une littérature, Bruxelles: Université Libre de Bruxelles, 1965.
  Diane T. Simard, Théorie et critique littéraires dans la revue "Présence africaine", Montréal: Université McGill, 1972 (Thèse M.A.).
  20e Anniversaire: Mélanges: réflexions d'hommes de culture, Présence Africaine 1947-1967, Paris: Présence Africaine, 1969.
  30e Anniversaire de Présence Africaine. Hommage à Alioune Diop, Paris: Présence Africaine, 1977.
  50e Anniversaire de Présence Africaine, 1947-1997: Colloque de Dakar, 25-27 novembre 1997, Paris: Présence Africaine (special edition), 1999, 385 pp.

External links
 La Maison d'édition (The Publisher) 
 Présence africaine, "Revue Culturelle du Monde Noir" (Liberation journals Index)
 "Genèse de la littérature afro-francophone en France entre les années 1940 et 1950"  (article by Katharina Städtler in Mots Pluriels, no. 8, October 1998.) 
 La revue Présence africaine avec son Directeur de la rédaction Romuald Fonkoua  (en ligne, une émission radiophonique de Canal Académie animation by François-Pierre Nizery, 30' 39)
 Histoire de la revue sur le site de la maison d'édition.  
 Thomas L. Blair, "Mother Africa in Europe: Mme. Diop of Présence Africaine", Chronicle World.

1947 establishments in France
Cultural magazines
French-language magazines
Literary magazines published in France
Magazines established in 1947
Magazines published in Paris
Political magazines published in France
Quarterly magazines published in France